Candelaria is a municipality and town in the Artemisa Province of Cuba. Before 2011 it was part of Pinar del Río Province. It was founded in 1809, and established as a municipality in 1880.

Geography
The municipality is divided into the barrios of Bayate, Carambola, Frías, Lomas, Pasto Rico, Pueblo, Pueblo Nuevo, Punta Brava, Río Hondo, San Juan de Contreras, San Juan del Norte, Soroa and Las Terrazas. The waterfall Salto de Soroa is located within the municipal territory.

Demographics
In 2004, the municipality of Candelaria had a population of 19,523.

See also
Municipalities of Cuba
List of cities in Cuba
Candelaria Municipal Museum

References

External links

Populated places in Artemisa Province